Acul-du-Nord is an arrondissement of the Nord department of Haiti. As of 2015, the population was 129,155 inhabitants. Postal codes in the Acul-du-Nord Arrondissement start with the number 12.

The arrondissement consists of the following municipalities:
 Acul-du-Nord
 Plaine-du-Nord
 Milot

References

Arrondissements of Haiti
Nord (Haitian department)